An air army was a type of formation of the Soviet Air Forces from 1936 until the dissolution of the USSR in 1991. Air armies continued to be used in the successor Russian Air Force until 2009, and, with a brief break under Serdyukov, from 2015.

The first three Air Armies, designated 'Air Armies of Special Purpose' were created between 1936 and 1938. 2nd Air Army was created on 15 March 1937 in the Far East. Somewhat later, the 3rd Air Army was created in the North Caucasus Military District. However, air armies were excluded from the organisational reform of the air forces approved on 25 July 1940. On 5 November 1940, the three existing air armies were reformed as the long range bombardment aviation of the Stavka of the Red Army due to poor combat performance during the Winter War with Finland.

From May - November 1942, seventeen Air Armies were created from the air forces of the Fronts and Combined Arms Armies, and in December 1944 a long-range aviation Air Army was created as the 18th Air Army. The 1st Air Army was the first created, on 5 May 1942, as part of the Western Front. The next to form during 1942 were the 2nd, 3rd, 4th (22 May 1942), 5th, 6th 8th Air Armies (June 1942), 9th/10th/11th/12th (Aug 1942), 7th and 13th Air Army (November 1942), 14th, 15th, 16th, and 17th Air Armies.

The Air Armies were integrated formations of the Fronts, and were subordinate to the Front commanders for all operating and operational purposes, including air combat operations. The Air Armies consisted of fighter, bomber, assault, and mixed Aviation Divisions, aviation corps, and separate aviation regiments. The structure of an Air Army during the Second World War fluctuated depending on the operational planning needs, and could include 3-4 aviation divisions, up to 8-9 aviation corps, up to 10 separate aviation divisions, and a number of separate aviation regiments, operating from 200-1,000 aircraft in 1942-43, and 1,500 to 3,000 aircraft in some strategic operations by 1944-45.

Also formed were the Air Armies of the Air Defence Forces (PVO), which combined all of the air formations and units of the military districts, and operated predominantly interceptor fighter aircraft. Many of these formations and units were subsequently transferred to the Frontal Air Armies.

While intended primarily for support of the ground forces, the Air Armies also cooperated with the naval forces of the Red Navy Fleets.

The 18th Air Army became Long Range Aviation (АДД), consisting of three armies - the 43rd, with its staff in Vinnitsa, the 50th in Smolensk, and the 65th at Khabarovsk. For Cold War-era air defence, aviation divisions and corps PVO armies were created - the 19th, 21st, 22nd, 25th, 32nd, 42nd, 52nd, and 78th (in Leningrad, Batumi, Arkhangelsk, Tallinn, Kiev, Baku, Yaroslavl and Moscow respectively).

Air Armies
There were eighteen air armies formed in World War II, with many others formed after 1945.

 45th Air and Air Defence Army, Transbaikal Military District 1949-57, reformed in the Northern Fleet in 2016 as part of the Arctic Joint Strategic Command 
 73rd Air Army (Alma-Ata, Central Asian Military District)
 76th Air Army (Leningrad, Leningrad Military District)

Armies of the Air Defence Forces

There were also the 25th (1949-54), 32nd, 42nd, and 52nd Fighter Armies of the Air Defence Forces.

References

Sources
Pan'kin V.E. Evolution of organisational structure of AirForce, and ways and methods of ruling and cooperation in Great Patriotic War years (rus)
Red Army Air Force organization (rus)
Kozlov, M.M., (ed.), Great Patriotic War 1941-1945 (Russian), encyclopaedia, Moscow, Soviet Encyclopaedia (pub.), 1985
Svischev, V.N. Gen. Maj. Aviation, Preparation of USSR for war (Russian) , 2002
Wagner, R. (ed.), Fetzer, L., (trans.), The Soviet Air Force in World War II: The official history, Wren Publishing Pty.Ltd., Melbourne, 1973
Keith E. Bonn (ed.), 'Slaughterhouse,' Aberjona Press, Bedford, PA, 2005
http://www.allaces.ru/cgi-bin/s2.cgi/sssr/struct/main.dat V.V. Kharin, Aviators of the Second World War (in Russian)

External links
Michael Holm, Air Armies, accessed August 2011

Units and formations of the Soviet Air Forces
Units and formations of the Russian Air Force
Air force units and formations